Andreas Gottlieb Masch (5 December 1724 – 26 October 1807) was a German Lutheran theologian and scholar.

He acted as superintendent for Mecklenburg-Strelitz and became court-preacher to the House of Mecklenburg-Strelitz at Neustrelitz, where he died. He is also known as Andreas Gottlieb Masch the Elder to distinguish him from his son of the same name.

References

 

1724 births
1807 deaths
German Lutheran theologians
18th-century Lutheran clergy
19th-century Lutheran clergy